Nogas is a  government naval reservation island in Antique Province, Philippines.

External links
Photo Narrative of Nogas Island, Anini-y, Antique Province

Islands of Antique (province)